Piz Costainas (also known as Furkelspitz) is a mountain of the Ortler Alps, straddling the Swiss-Italian border between Graubünden and South Tyrol. It is the easternmost mountain rising above 3,000 metres in Switzerland.

References

External links
 Piz Costainas on Hikr.org

Ortler Alps
Mountains of the Alps
Alpine three-thousanders
Mountains of Switzerland
Mountains of Italy
Mountains of Graubünden
Italy–Switzerland border
International mountains of Europe
Val Müstair